Eveline Goodman-Thau (born 1934) was the first female rabbi in Austria, a job she began in 2001. She was born in Vienna. Eveline survived the Holocaust by hiding with her family in the Netherlands. She was privately ordained in Jerusalem in October 2000 by Orthodox rabbi Jonathan Chipman. She later led the liberal Jewish community in Vienna for one year, beginning in 2001.

In 1999, she was the founding director of the Herman Cohen Academy for European Jewish Studies in Buchen, Odenwald, Germany.

See also
Timeline of women rabbis

References 

1934 births
Living people
21st-century Austrian rabbis
Women rabbis
Recipients of the Cross of the Order of Merit of the Federal Republic of Germany